The M5 Bomb Trailer is a 2½ ton capacity vehicle used during World War II for transporting bombs from munitions storage areas to the aircraft for loading. Up to six M5s can be towed in a train. The trailer weighs 7,200 pounds when fully loaded.
The front pair of wheels are mounted on a caster assembly like a shopping cart. They are free to rotate 360 degrees about their vertical axis. There is a damper assembly that resembles 1/2 of a disk brake rotor that has friction pucks pressing against it to dampen oscillations of the caster assembly. 
These trailers would be towed out to the flightline all hitched together like a train and the train would stop at the first bomber and the last trailer in the train would be disconnected. The train would then continue on to the next bomber. After the train left, the crew would manhandle the trailer to a position under the bomber to enable the loading of the bombs. The front caster wheel assembly made this relatively easy. And so each trailer would be detached and when the towing vehicle had left the last trailer, it would circle around and go back and pick up the now empty first trailer detached. Then it would proceed to pick the rest of the trailers, one at a time.

History
These trailers were used extensively in World War II on air bases for the transport of bombs and other ordnance. Many were also used in the Korean War and Vietnam War as well. versions include the M1 and M2 Chemical trailer. these were usually towed by the M1 Bomb service truck, 1½-Ton, 4×4, (Ford) and  M6 Bomb service truck, 1½-Ton, 4×4, (Chevy)

Specifications

Net Weight: 2,200 lb
Payload: 5,000 lb
Length: 17’6”
Width: 7’4”
Height: 3’ 11.5”
Wheelbase: 102”
Ground Clearance 9.5”

Speed: 45 mph (road)
20 mph (country side)

Tires: Front: 6-ply  6.5 × 10      Back: 8-ply 7.5 × 18

Survivors
There are five known examples in museums, two of which have been restored (one at the Imperial War Museum Duxford, UK and one at the National Museum of the United States Air Force in Dayton, Ohio).  Two more are undergoing restoration, one at the Carolinas Aviation Museum in Charlotte, North Carolina, and one at the Yankee Air Museum.  Both are in need of a complete overhaul. The Collings Foundation (Stow MA USA) also has three unrestored M5's. Others are in private Historic Military Vehicle (HMV) collectors hands around the USA and the world.

Carolinas Aviation Museum
Imperial War Museum Duxford
National Museum of the United States Air Force
Yankee Air Museum
Flyhistorisk Museum, Sola, Norway. Restored in USN Glossy Sea Blue color. Temporary stored.

See also
 M-numbers
 G-numbers (G74)

References

Notes

Bibliography

 
 
 
 
 SNL G-74

External links
 http://www.footnote.com/image/55724004/#48492938
 https://images.google.com/hosted/life/l?q=gasoline++source:life&imgurl=be63dff04d68237e 

Military trailers of the United States
World War II vehicles of the United States
Military vehicles introduced from 1940 to 1944